Patrick Herrmann (born 16 March 1988) is a German professional footballer who plays as a right-back for SC Weiche Flensburg 08.

External links 
 
 
 

1988 births
Footballers from Berlin
Living people
German footballers
Association football defenders
Hannover 96 players
Hannover 96 II players
VfL Osnabrück players
Holstein Kiel players
SV Darmstadt 98 players
SC Weiche Flensburg 08 players
Bundesliga players
2. Bundesliga players
3. Liga players
Regionalliga players
Oberliga (football) players